A guyot or tablemount is an isolated underwater volcanic mountain.

Guyot may also refer to:

 Guyot (surname), including a list of people with the name
 Guyot (vine system), a system for training grape vines
 Hilton v. Guyot, an 1895 United States Supreme Court case
 Guyot (crater), a lunar impact crater on the far side of the Moon

See also
 
 Mount Guyot (disambiguation)